The Yalmakán Fútbol Club, commonly known as Yalmakán, is a Mexican football club based in Chetumal. The club was founded in 2013, and currently plays in the Serie A of Liga Premier.

History
The club was founded in 2013.

Final Apertura 2017
After Winning the Clausura 2017 title and Ascenso in Liga Nuevo Talentos, Yalmakán were supposed to play in Serie A but the league restructure the league to make more efficient by every team structure based by stadium capacity, fans, etc., meaning that Yalmakán will stay in Serie B in hopes of improving their team structure in order to play in Serie A if they win promotion. This is their second straight final in hopes of making it back to back titles in  franchise history facing a team were supposed to play in Ascenso MX but Tlaxcala and FMF denied their invite because of their stadium not met requirements.

First leg

Second leg

Promotion to Serie A 
Despite being eliminated from the quarterfinals in Clausura 2018, Yalmakan played in the final de Ascenso against Orizaba. Won in Puerto Morelos in first leg 2–0 however they tied at Veracruz 1–1 in second leg but secured promotion. The team was relocated from Puerto Morelos to Chetumal in order to meet requirements to play in Serie A and on July 6, 2018 they earned a spot to play in Serie A.

Players

Current squad

References

External links 

Association football clubs established in 2013
Football clubs in Quintana Roo
2013 establishments in Mexico
Liga Premier de México